Lycett is a surname. Notable people with the surname include:

Andrew Lycett, English biographer and journalist
Eustace Lycett (1914–2006), British visual effects artist
Gwendolyn Lycett, British figure skater
Joe Lycett, English comedian
Joseph Lycett (1774–1825), portrait and miniature painter, active in Australia
Randolph Lycett (1886–1935), men's doubles tennis player

See also
Candida Lycett Green (1942–2014), British author, wife of Rupert
Rupert Lycett Green (born 1938), British fashion designer